Panitya is a locality situated in the Sunraysia region.  The place by road, is situated about 23 kilometres east from Pinnaroo and 10 kilometres west from Carina on the Mallee Highway.

Panitya is a railway station on the Ouyen to Pinnaroo line.

The Post Office opened in 1910 and was closed in 1975.

The area of the locality contains a number of smaller areas, namely Panitya East which had a post office open from 1916 until 1933, Berrook which had a post office open from 1929 until 1935, Manya with a post office from 1928 until 1936, Sunset with a post office from 1921 until 1948 and, below the Mallee Highway, Ngallo.

Notes and references

Towns in Victoria (Australia)
Mallee (Victoria)